Hongyazi is a town in Xingcheng, Liaoning. , it administers the following 19 villages:
Hongyazi Village
Tangtun Village
Liangjiatun Village
Erdaobian Village
Sandaobian Village
Guchengzi Village
Zhoutun Village
Laofuma Village
Xi'ertaizi Village
Jianjin Village
Bianhaozi Village
Tuanshanzi Village
Dadonggou Village
Laoshaoguo Village
Xinqi Village
Wujiatun Village
Dashantai Village
Xiaoshantai Village
Yingshu Village

References

Xingcheng
Township-level divisions of Liaoning